Santa Rosa is a district of the Rodríguez de Mendoza Province, Peru. Santa Rosa District is located at an elevation of 1,640 above sea level and covers and area of 36.79 km².

Santa Rosa District, according to projections of the National Institute of Statistics and Computer science for the year 2004 a population of 741 inhabitants is projected doing 89.8% showing a high index of ruralización, whereas in urban area 11.2%

External links
Santa Rosa district official website 

Districts of the Rodríguez de Mendoza Province
Districts of the Amazonas Region